Shmarnoye is a rural locality (a selo) in Starooskolsky District, Belgorod Oblast, Russia. The population was 271 as of 2010. There are 11 streets.

Geography 
Shmarnoye is located 28 km south of Stary Oskol (the district's administrative centre) by road. Kazachok is the nearest rural locality.

References 

Rural localities in Starooskolsky District